Charles Sonibancke DD (1564 - 12 October 1638) was a Canon of Windsor from 1598 to 1638

Career

He was educated St Mary Hall, Oxford and Christ Church, Oxford where he graduated BA in 1586, MA in 1589 and DD in 1607.

He was appointed:
Official of the Archbishop of Canterbury 1596
Rector of Wrotham, Kent 1597
Rector of Wittenham, Berkshire 1597
Rector of Great Haseley, Oxfordshire 1610

He was appointed to the eighth stall in St George's Chapel, Windsor Castle in 1598 and held the canonry until 1638.

Notes 

1564 births
1638 deaths
Canons of Windsor
Alumni of Christ Church, Oxford